Lokossa is an arrondissement, commune, and the capital city of Mono Department in Benin. The name Lokossa translates into English as "underneath the iroko tree".

References

Communes of Benin
Arrondissements of Benin
Populated places in the Mono Department